Ernest Henri Griset (born 24 August 1843 in Boulogne-sur-Mer, died in London on 22 March 1907) was a French-born painter and illustrator noted for the humorous interpretations of his subjects.

Life and work
Griset's parents moved to England from France in 1848. He studied for a while under the Belgian artist Louis Gallait before moving back to England, then regularly drew the animals at the London Zoo as a basis for his paintings and illustrations. He became known particularly for his humorous and satirical designs, which were best displayed in his two Christmas books, Griset’s Grotesques, or Jokes Drawn on Wood (1867), which was accompanied by the comic verses of Tom Hood; and an illustrated edition of Aesop’s Fables (1869). Of the latter a reviewer noted that "nothing so quaint as these illustrations has appeared since the days of Grandville…Griset possesses the faculty of investing his animals with human expression, without ever causing them to lose their own identity, and of making them funny without being ridiculous."

Many examples of Griset's work are now in the collections of the Victoria and Albert Museum. Less well known are the prehistoric hunting scenes specially commissioned by Sir John Lubbock, some of which are in Bromley Museum, and which were a ground-breaking and sympathetic treatment of the subject. Some of his comic work appeared in Punch, where he was briefly on the staff between 1867-9, as well as in its competitor, Fun.

A decade later, Griset may have been complicit in an attempt to revive his sales by having a death notice appear in The Times on 9 July 1877, where he was described as having "produced countless drawings in grotesque of animals and human savages, which wise collectors obtained for trivial sums at an untidy little shop near Leicester Square". A few days later the paper admitted that he was neither dead nor even ailing. He was, in fact, to survive for another thirty years.

References

Further reading
Aesop's Fables, Rev. and rewritten by J.B. Rundell, London, New York : Cassell Petter and Galpin 1869
Lionel Lambourne,  Ernest Griset: Fantasies of a Victorian Illustrator, Thames and Hudson, 1979.

External links

1843 births
1907 deaths
19th-century English artists
English illustrators
Punch (magazine) cartoonists